Got the Life: My Journey of Addiction, Faith, Recovery, and Korn is an autobiography by Korn bassist Reginald "Fieldy" Arvizu. It was released on March 10, 2009. The book details Arvizu's life; from his childhood, to his stardom in Korn, to the death of his father, to his conversion to Christianity and, ultimately, to becoming sober. Before his father's death, Arvizu was an alcoholic and a marijuana user.

See also

2009 non-fiction books
Music autobiographies